Radyvýliv is a small city in Rivne Oblast (region) of western Ukraine. It is the administrative center of Radyvyliv Raion (district), and is located south-west of the oblast capital, Rivne, near European route E40. In Soviet times, from 1939 to 1992, the city was known as Chervonoarmiysk. Population:

History
In the 14th century, together with whole Volhynia, Radyvyliv was annexed by the Grand Duchy of Lithuania. Following the 1569 Union of Lublin, the town was transferred to the Kingdom of Poland, where it remained for over 200 years. As a result of the Partitions of Poland, Radziwiłłow, as it was called, became a town of the Kremenetsky Uyezd in the Volhynian Governorate of the Russian Empire.

In the late 1800s, the Jewish population reached 4,000. Between World War I and the civil war between Ukrainian nationalists and Bolsheviks, the Jewish population declined to around 2,000.

During the January Uprising, a unit of Jozef Wysocki operated in the area of Radyvyliv. After World War I, the town returned to Poland, and was part of Dubno County, Volhynian Voivodeship. Its residents were Jewish (50%), Ukrainian (31%), and Polish (17%). During the Volhynian Genocide, ethnic Poles from villages in the area fled to the town, to escape Ukrainian nationalists. Almost all those who survived the slaughter left Radyvyliv, and settled in the People's Republic of Poland’s Recovered Territories.

During the Second World War Axis forces occupied town since June 1941 until March 1944.

In January 1989 the population was 10 353 people.

People 
 Anton Kushnir (*1984) — Belarusian aerial skier of Ukrainian origin, was born here.

References

External links
 Radyvyliv. info
 Website
 Radyvyliv.Photo
 

Cities in Rivne Oblast
Volhynian Governorate
Wołyń Voivodeship (1921–1939)
Cities of district significance in Ukraine
Volhynian Voivodeship (1569–1795)
City name changes in Ukraine
Former Soviet toponymy in Ukraine
Holocaust locations in Ukraine
Jewish communities destroyed in the Holocaust